The Shandao Temple is a temple in Zhongzheng District, Taipei, Taiwan. It is the largest Buddhist temple in Taipei.

History
Shandao Temple was built in Japanese rule period. It was called Jōdo-shū Taihoku Betsu-in (淨土宗臺北別院), which was a branch temple of Jōdo-shū.

Transportation
Shandao Temple is accessible within walking distance East from Shandao Temple Station of the Taipei Metro.

See also
 Buddhism in Taiwan
 Yin Shun, Abbot (1956-1957)
 Linji Huguo Chan Temple, Zhongshan District
 Nung Chan Monastery, Beitou District
 List of temples in Taiwan
 List of tourist attractions in Taiwan

References

External links

  

1926 establishments in Taiwan
Buddhist temples in Taipei
Religious buildings and structures completed in 1926